The Confederation of African Esports (CAES) is the governing body of Esports in Africa.

Members
So far, there are 5 member nations in CAES.

History
Confederation of African Esports was formally constituted on 14 December 2008.

Structure 
Confederation of African Esports, like other sports confederations, is constituted as a voluntary association.

The highest authority of the CAES is the Annual General Meeting which holds all Committees accountable for their actions.

The management board deals with the day-to-day operations of CAES and overseas the different Boards of Control.

History of the emblem
In 2008 the logo included the mind sports logo. The mind sports logo was dropped in 2013 in favour of the wording 'CAES'.

Official Test matches 
The following Test matches were held:

Continental Championships

Presidents 
CAES has had the following Presidents for the period 2008 to present:

References

External links
 Esports Tournaments
 HIP2B2
 http://gaming.do.co.za/articles/localnews/africon_dota_champs_split_up.htm 
 http://www.sk-gaming.com/content/20288-SK_CS_and_DotA_SAfrican_Promo_tour_Spawn_returns 
 http://www.teamplay.com.br/noticias/counter-strike/827-sk-spawn-substitui-tentpole http://mybroadband.co.za/vb/showthread.php/143255-African-Continental-Computer-Championships
 http://mybroadband.co.za/vb/showthread.php/149038-Protea-Gaming-Team-vs-SK http://gaming.do.co.za/articles/news/dota_protea_gamers_face_uphill_task.htm http://mybroadband.co.za/nephp/3977.html 
  
 http://www.team-aaa.com/news-12805-tous-0-africon_accueillait_sk.html http://egmr.net/2009/03/bravado-gaming-interviews-snow-from-the-old-sk-dota-team/ http://egmr.net/2009/12/question-of-the-day-your-most-memorable-gaming-moment/
 

Sports science
Esports governing bodies
Esports